Jinan Zoo, formerly known as Taurus Park was founded in October 1959. It opened 1 May 1960, and was renamed Jinan Zoo on
8 September 1989. Jinan Zoo is one of China's largest zoos in it is located in Shandong province.

History

Jinan zoo is located in the northern part of Jinan. It opened its doors to the public on 1 May 1960. Jinan is one of the most pronounced zoos in China. In 1995 it was named one of the top 10 zoos in China. It is now a large scale zoo which is involved in activities such as breeding, tours, zoology, entertainment and catering.
It contains more than 300 different species of animals with over 5000 animals in total. The zoo features four unique zones: animal display, entertainment, education and catering. In 1999 it constructed an open peacock area where peacocks can roam free. In 2000, US$800,000 was raised to construct China's most advanced herbivore natural habitat exhibit. Visitors are able to walk-through this exhibit. In 2001, they once again raised over US$1,000,000,000 to construct a facility that allows young people to interact with animals. The flow to the zoo has reached over one million visitors a year.

Park introduction

Employees at the zoo have contributed in many types of great achievements such as the knowledge of animal science, animal protection and animal breeding research.

Major species on display

Valuable species originated from China include: giant panda, golden monkey, Asian elephant, takin, kiang, Thorold's deer, hoolock gibbon, Francois' leaf monkey, fox, red-crowned crane.

Breeding

In 1992, they introduced a pair of Sichun golden monkeys which they have successfully bred. Making Jinan zoo one of the few zoos that can successfully breed domesticate golden monkeys. In 1998, an area of 3000m2 was created for the hundred-bird paradise that contains over 150 different species of birds to promote breeding.

To meet the giant pandas and red pandas living needs, Jinan Zoo in the 1970s introduced large amounts of bamboo, which has grown into five hectares of bamboo forest. Jinan Zoo strives to create a natural environment between the animals and their caregivers to best simulate life as it would have been in the wild.

Imported precious species

African elephant, gorillas, chimpanzees, orangutans, white tigers, giraffes and
zebras.

A group of professionals from Jinan Zoo that specialize in zoology have successfully bred Asian elephants, golden monkeys, gibbons, langurs, takin, black stork, white stork, grey kangaroo, white-lipped deer, giraffes, seals and other species of rare animals.

Animal celebrities

Jinan Zoo's top ten animal celebrities: giant panda, grey wolf, golden monkey, white tiger, Bengal tiger, leopard, giraffes, gorillas, zebras, egret.

Giant panda Taotao

Taotao was a giant panda rescued in 1986 by Gansu Wen County Taojiawan. She was named Taotao because she was rescued in Taojiawan. Since then, she has served as an envoy and visited the United States and other countries. When she was sent to Jinan Zoo, Taotao was already a 22-year-old age panda. On February 6, 2008, the "longevity celebrity” was suffering and died from senile hypertension, secondary to cerebral thrombosis and liver dysfunction in Jinan Zoo. According to convention, Taotao should return to her original home – Baishuijiang National Nature Reserve in Gansu after death. Despite this tradition her influence when she was alive was so string that she was eventually made into specimen and remained in Jinan Zoo.

Gorilla Willie

Male, born in 1976 in Nürnberg/Germany. After the Barcelona international wolf breeding center donated him to Jinan Zoo, Jinan Zoo married the eight-year-old bachelor wolf, through the "pro-change", to room "Lady” in 2009.

The wolf's mannerisms changed drastically upon being introduced to "Lady". Before it used to fight for its food. Upon the introduction of "Lady" it will not touch the food until the female wolf finishes eating. If it wasn't for the zoo's walls locals say "he might even catch sheep everyday to honour his wife". There is also another interesting characteristic to the wolf. Despite having spent many years in captivity his nature remains unchanged. The wolf seems to get immense satisfaction from digging holes. He likes to dig a yard full of holes and will cache meat in them.

Panda Quan Quan

Giant panda Quan Quan No. 20 is a “hero mother” to seven baby pandas, known as the number one beauty Wolong giant panda. September 24, 2007, which she was “loaned” to Jinan Zoo from Sichuan Wolong; the only giant panda with a permanent settlement in the zoo. In December 2007, the enthusiastic people in provincial capital named her "Quan Quan." Quan Quan is the name from selected from over 1000 suggested names, meaning spring.

Future

The zoo utilizes the animal natural characteristics to isolate and keep animals in their regions. This way by reducing the number of fences and walls used it can create a better environment for both humans and animals. However, this idea still requires further discussion and regarding safety. In the near future, the zoo hopes to increase the amount of human-animal interactions.

Public transportation

Jinan Zoo is also a public transit hub. Line 4 of the Jinan BRT transportation system stops at the Jinan Zoo Station. The zoo is the bus terminus for routes4, 5, 15,12,30and 35. Bus routes 4, 35, 30, 15, 5, 66, K68, 84, 85, K90, K92 K53, K50, K58, 111, 114, 112, 130, 203 and 35 also stop at the zoo.

Nearby attractions

To the west of the zoo is the Jinan Planetarium, which is located diagonally across the street from the zoo's main entrance. To the east is a shopping mall and the Jinan Restaurant.

References 

Zoos in China
Buildings and structures in Jinan
Tourist attractions in Jinan
Zoos established in 1960